Draper is an unincorporated community in the town of Draper, Sawyer County, Wisconsin, United States.

History
A post office called Draper was established in 1906, and remained in operation until it was discontinued in 1935. The community was named for Lyman Draper, a Wisconsin historian.

References

Unincorporated communities in Sawyer County, Wisconsin
Unincorporated communities in Wisconsin